Operation Typical was the name of the first World War II British mission fully assigned to Yugoslav Partisans HQ and Marshall Tito organised by the Special Operations Executive (SOE).  The six soldiers flew from Derna airfield on 27 May 1943 and parachuted to Black Lake in Montenegro at the height of a large German offensive Operation Schwarz which aimed to destroy the Partisan forces.  The group was led by Col William Deakin and Capt William F Stuart, together with the two radio operators - Sergeants Walter Wroughton and Peretz 'Rose' Rosenberg.  Canadian-Yugoslav Ivan ('John') Starčević acted as a translator and Sgt John Campbell (RM) was a cipher clerk, and bodyguard.

Purpose 

The mission insisted on sabotage operations, offering explosives and, if necessary, British demolition experts, for this purpose.  The selection of targets varied, from disrupting German supplies to North Africa by cutting off the railway line to Greece to shipments of Romanian oil and Yugoslav minerals (e.g. copper, chrome and bauxite) to Germany.

Route 
Deakin and the team followed Partisan HQ across the Durmitor range ending up in German, Italian and Bulgarian encirclement under heavy bombing.  On 9 June 1943, Stuart was killed in an air-raid while Tito was wounded in the shoulder.  The party broke through the encirclement at Tjentište in the middle of the night and informed Cairo HQ on 13 June 1943.

By the end of June they arranged timings and locations for the explosives and medical aid to be parachuted while they moved onto Olovo, Kladanj and Vlasenica.  On 30 July 1943 they reached Bijela Voda near Žepče, where Deakin witnessed and reported on the destruction of fourteen kilometres of railway tracks.  By 4 August the party reached plateau of Petrovo Polje, where they were able to welcome additional SOE officers being parachuted.  Flight-Lieutenant Kenneth Syers (RAF), who came to replace William Stuart, and the surgeon Major Ian Mackenzie (RAMC) on 15 August, and the following day Major Basil Davidson who was to command his own Mission. For their own safety, the group had to move to Jajce on 25 August 1943.

Italian surrender 
The Italian army surrendered to the Anglo-American forces in Italy on 8 September 1943.  Soon after, British G.H.Q. instructed the mission to negotiate an armistice and carry out the disarming of the Italian troops, which was rejected by Tito who demanded the Italians surrender to Partisan troops.  The main race was towards Split, the Italian HQ, with the aim to disarm the Italians before the German troops reclaimed the region.  On 11 September 1943, Deakin, together with an American Capt M Benson left for Bugojno, to join Gen Koča Popović and the 1st Proleterian Brigade on their way to Split.  They arrived on 16 September 1943, and found Gen Becuzzi, the commander of the Bergamo Division with 14,000 already disarmed soldiers.  Deakin and Benson, together with Lt John Burge, witnessed Becuzzi signing the terms of surrender.

After a brief speech to the citizens of Split in the main square, translated by Ivo Lola Ribar, Deakin and Wroughton returned to Jajce via Sajkovići, Grahovo and Drvar.

Mission expansion and failed evacuation attempt 
On 26 September 1943 Deakin reported to the recently arrived Brigadier-General Fitzroy Maclean in Mrkonjic-Grad.  The new commander, heading his own Maclean Mission (Macmis) felt that Deakin, after three months at Tito's HQ "should give us a better idea than anyone of what the partisans were worth".  The two officers continued to assess partisans' strength, willingness to fight and aid priorities.

As German troops started to reclaim Dalmatian coast and the islands, Maclean decided to go to Cairo and agree the further course of action.  He agreed to take Ivo Lola Ribar and Miloje Milojević as emissaries of good will, subject to the Commander-in-chief and Foreign Office approvals.  Maclean left Jajce for Cairo on 5 October 1943 where he presented Anthony Eden with a written report of his views and findings, before returning to Italy to organise the evacuation of Ribar and Milojević from an improvised airstrip at Glamoč.  During Nov 1943, Maclean made three sorties trying to find and land there but each time the snowstorms, fog and heavy clouds forced him to return.  By now, the partisans were getting impatient and had organised their own mission in a recently captured German airplane.  On 27 November 1943 as they were trying to board, the airplane came under bombardment and Ribar, together with two British officers was killed and the mission abandoned.

Completion 
Knowing that the airstrip was likely to be lost to Germans soon, Maclean procured a troop-carrying Dakota, and landed there on 2 December 1943.  Without switching the engines, they were able to take in Deakin, Anthony Hunter, Vladimir Velebit, and heavily wounded Milojević and Vladimir Dedijer.  Finally, they on-boarded a German Abwehr officer Capt Meyer who was taken POW at Jajce earlier.  The first landing operation in the enemy-occupied Yugoslavia had been successfully completed, bringing Operation Typical to an end.

References

Sources

Yugoslavia in World War II
Eastern European theatre of World War II
Special Operations Executive operations
United Kingdom–Yugoslavia relations